Macadamia integrifolia is a small to medium-sized tree, growing to 15 metres in height. Native to rainforests in south east Queensland and northern New South Wales, Australia.  Common names include macadamia, smooth-shelled macadamia, bush nut, Queensland nut, Bauple nut and nut oak.

Description
Macadamia integrifolia leaves are simple, oblong in shape, glossy, entire with wavy leaf margins and are 20 cm long and 10 cm wide. The flowers are white or pink followed by woody, edible rounded fruits which are 2 to 3.5 cm in diameter.

This tree is rarely cultivated for ornamental purposes.

It has been introduced to Mexico and has done well in the states of Michoacán and Jalisco.

The trees will survive in hardiness zones 10 and 11.

The trees in Australia can be affected by a fungal pathogens from the Neopestalotiopsis genus and the Pestalotiopsis genus (both are within Sporocadaceae family), they both cause flower blight.

See also
Macadamia nuts

References

Other sources
 

integrifolia
Bushfood
Edible nuts and seeds
Crops originating from Australia
Flora of New South Wales
Flora of Queensland
Proteales of Australia
Trees of Australia
Vulnerable flora of Australia